"Bloom" is a song by Australian singer-songwriter Troye Sivan. Written by Sivan, Peter Svensson, Leland and its producer Oscar Holter, the song was released by EMI Music Australia on 2 May 2018, as the third single from his second studio album of the same name.

Background and release
Sivan first revealed the song in an interview with Popjustice. He described the song as "complete pop. Like: 'Katy Perry Teenage Dream' pop", deeming it "the most subversively queer song on the album". In another interview with Dazed, the song was described by the interviewer as "a gay anthem for bottoms", on which Sivan "takes the role of what sounds like the receptive partner losing his virginity". When asked if that is what the song is about, Sivan replied with a wink: "It's 100 per cent about flowers! That's all it is. Call it whatever you wanna call it. I wanna play that song at every Pride."

To promote the single, Sivan launched his own mobile app on 30 April 2018. The app contains a video, in which Sivan can be seen seated on a bed with a male partner sleeping behind him, which was revealed to be his then boyfriend Jacob Bixenman. He then looks at the camera and says, "It's about flowers", before a clip from the song plays in the background. The song's title flashes across the screen, with the release details appearing in a smaller font below. He later posted the same video on social media and YouTube. The app also has cryptic photos of fluorescent, doll-like figures, as seen in the cover art and lyric video.

Composition
"Bloom" is a pop, dance-pop, and synth-pop anthem about queer desire. It starts with "looming, atmospheric synths", before building up to a euphoric chorus which "introduces a sharp, driving snare". As the song progresses, Sivan "moves into a second chorus and rides a wave of sparkling beats to a heady crescendo".

Videos

Lyric video
A lyric video was released alongside the song. The video, animated by the 3D artist Jason Ebeyer, finds an Ex Machina-type simulacrum of Sivan floating in his fantasy land. At the beginning, Sivan sits in a lush garden surrounded by flowers. He then floats through an abandoned warehouse under iridescent lights. Idolator's Mike Nied opined that "the contrast between the natural shapes and the hard lines of the buildings add some depth to the visual, and it definitely leaves a lasting impression".

Music video
On 6 June 2018, Sivan released a music video for "Bloom" on his YouTube channel. It was directed by Bardia Zeinali and processed in a 4:3 aspect ratio. It shows Sivan posing in drag outfits with flowers, and in a Draco Malfoy-esque ensemble, Greek muse busts and muscled arms flexing.

Credits and personnel
Credits adapted from Tidal.
 Troye Sivan – composition
 Peter Svensson – composition
 Leland – composition, background vocals
 Oscar Holter – composition, production
 Randy Merrill – master engineering
 John Hanes – engineering
 Serban Ghenea – mixing

Charts

Certifications

References

External links
 

2018 songs
2018 singles
Troye Sivan songs
Songs about cross-dressing
Songs written by Peter Svensson
Songs written by Oscar Holter
Songs written by Leland (musician)
LGBT-related songs
Songs written by Troye Sivan
Capitol Records singles
Anal eroticism